J10 may refer to:

Vehicles

Aircraft 
 Chengdu J-10, a Chinese fighter aircraft
 Junkers J 10, a German ground attack aircraft

Automobiles 
 Jeep J10, an American pickup truck
 Karsan J10, a Turkish minibus
 Subaru J10, a Japanese hatchback

Locomotives 
 LNER Class J10, a class of British steam locomotives

Other uses 
 Gyroelongated square pyramid (J10), a Johnson solid
 Malaysia Federal Route J10
 Sony Ericsson J10, a mobile phone

See also
JIO (disambiguation)